Sacret Path is the fourth studio album by the Contemporary Christian and gospel singer Raymond Cilliers.

Track listing 
 Loving You
 I know You
 O Sacret King
 Reaching For You
 Your Majesty
 Honour and praise
 Lost in your Glory
 We place in Your wings of Worship
 I Simply live For You
 Clothe Me in White
 Your Majesty (Spanish Version)
 Hungry for You

References

2001 albums
Raymond Cilliers albums